Derek James Luh (born June 24, 1992) is an American hip-hop artist, songwriter, and actor from Valencia, Santa Clarita, California. Luh was signed to Mark Battle's label, Fly America, toured with Machine Gun Kelly, and collaborated with French Montana and Dizzy Wright.

Discography

Albums 
 L.A. Confidential (via DatPiff) 2013
 The Fortunate Few (w/ SK8) 2015
 Hollywood Blvd 2015
 The Second Coming 2015

EPs 
 Disposable Hero 2017
 Socks & Slides 2020

Singles
 "Bad Boy" 2016
 "Grow Up" 2017
 "Now You Know" 2016

Filmography

Television

References

1992 births
Living people
American hip hop musicians
Songwriters from California